Javier Arizala (born April 21, 1984) is a Colombian footballer. He played as a left-defender or midfielder, for León de Huánuco of the Torneo Descentralizado in Peru.

Arizala played for the Colombia national team at leftback for all the games in Copa America 2007 as well as all the friendlies played under coach Jorge Luis Pinto. He was part of the 4th-place finishing U-20 team in the 2003 FIFA World Youth Championship.

External links

 BDFA profile

1984 births
Living people
Colombian footballers
Colombian expatriate footballers
Colombia international footballers
Colombia under-20 international footballers
Cortuluá footballers
Atlético Nacional footballers
Deportes Tolima footballers
Deportes Quindío footballers
Deportivo Pasto footballers
Racing Club de Avellaneda footballers
Expatriate footballers in Argentina
Independiente Santa Fe footballers
Águilas Doradas Rionegro players
León de Huánuco footballers
Expatriate footballers in Peru
Categoría Primera A players
Argentine Primera División players
Peruvian Primera División players
2007 Copa América players
Association football fullbacks
People from Cundinamarca Department